Komenda may refer to:
Fort Komenda, a British fort on the Gold Coast
Komenda-Edina-Eguafo-Abirem (Ghana parliament constituency)
Municipality of Komenda in Slovenia
Komenda, a town in Slovenia

See also
Komenda Wars, wars involving Britain, the Netherlands and Eguafo along the Gold Coast